was an influential and popular novelist of post-World War II Japan.

Education, early career, and family
Born at Daikancho 82, Hirosaki, Aomori Prefecture, Ishizaka went to Hirosaki Middle School in 1913 and then to Keio University in 1920. Upon graduating, he took a position at Hirosaki Women's High School. Later, he became a teacher at Akita Women's High School. From 1929 to 1938 he taught at Yokote Junior High School.

In 1939, he moved to Tokyo, and in 1940, during World War II, he was a news correspondent in the Philippines.

One of his granddaughters was Tomi Pierce (1953-2010), a writer and later producer of video games including Prince of Persia and The Last Express (admired for its story-telling), with Jordan Mechner; she also worked with her husband Doug Carlston, founder of Broderbund. Another granddaughter, Tomi's sister Naomi Pierce, is an authority on butterflies and a professor at Harvard University.

Writing career
His novel Blue Mountain Range (青い山脈 Aoi sanmyaku) helped introduce the concept of the "New Japan" - a postwar culture that could look forward to a new future.

While widely popular in Japan, to the point that some of his stories were made into multiple movies, only a small portion of his writings have been translated and published in English.

Writings
 "Go to See a Sea" published in Mita Bungaku magazine (1927)
 Wakai Hito published in Mita Bungaku magazine (1933)
 Wakai hito (1937) (novel)
 Doku-ganryu masamune (1942) (novel)
 Blue Mountain Range (青い山脈 Aoi sanmyaku) (1947) (novel)
 film adaptation: 青い山脈 Aoi sanmyaku (1949 film) (1949)
 film adaptation: 續 青い山脈 Zoku aoi sanmyaku (1949)
 film adaptation: 青い山脈 新子の巻 Aoi sanmyaku Shinko no maki (1957)
 film adaptation: 続青い山脈　雪子の巻 Zoku Aoi sanmyaku Yukiko no maki (1957)
 film adaptation: 青い山脈 Aoi sanmyaku (1963 film) (1963)
 film adaptation: 青い山脈 Aoi sanmyaku (1975 film) (1975)
 film adaptation: 青い山脈'88 Aoi sanmyaku '88 (1988)
 Ishinaka sensei gyojoki (1950) (story)
 Wakai hito (1952) (novel)
 Kuchizuke, III: Onna doshi (1955) (story)
 Nikui mono (1957) (story)
 Hi no ataru sakamichi (1958) (novel)
 Wakai musumetachi (1958) (story)
 Suzukake no sanpomichi (1959) (novel)
 Aruhi watashi wa (1959) (novel)
 Kiri no naka no shojo (1959)
 Kawano hotoride (1962) (story)
 Izuko e (1966) (story)
 Wakai musume ga ippai (1966) (story)
 Ishinaka sensei gyojoki (1966) (story)
 Hi no ataru sakamichi (1967) (novel)
 Film adaptation: A Slope in the Sun (1958) was directed by Tomotaka Tasaka.
 Dare no isu? (1968) (novel)
 Film adaptation: Dare no isu? (1968) 
 Hi no ataru sakamichi (1975) (novel)
 Aitsu to watashi (1976) (novel)
 Wakai hito (1977) (novel)

See also 
 The Baby Carriage (乳母車 Ubaguruma), 1956 film based on one of Ishizaka's stories

References

External links
 IMDB listing for Yojiro Ishizaka https://www.imdb.com/name/nm0411151/
 Biography https://web.archive.org/20070616081122/http://www.media-akita.or.jp/akita-pioneers/ishizaka1E.html
 Key dates in Ishizaka's life https://web.archive.org/20070616081122/http://www.media-akita.or.jp/akita-pioneers/ishizaka2E.html
 Yojiro Ishizaka Memorial Hall https://web.archive.org/web/20070616081122/http://www.media-akita.or.jp/akita-pioneers/ishizaka2E.html

Japanese male short story writers
People from Hirosaki
1900 births
1986 deaths
20th-century Japanese novelists
20th-century Japanese short story writers
20th-century Japanese male writers